Dadichiluka Veera Gouri Sankara Rao (born 30 April 1968), sometimes called D. Shankar Rao or D.V.G. Shankar Rao, is an Indian anesthesiologist and politician who served as a Telugu Desam Party member of the Andhra Pradesh Legislative Assembly and of the Lok Sabha.

Background 
Shankar Rao is an adivasi, and was born 30 April 1968 in Palika Valasu village. He earned his M.B.B.S. and later specialised in anesthesiology in earning his medical doctorate. He became active in the T.D.P. in his district, and was nominated to and served in the Andhra Pradesh L.A.

Lok Sabha 
In the 1999 general election Shankar Rao was elected as a member of the Lok Sabha from Parvathipuram constituency, a seat reserved for members of the scheduled tribes. He won with 304,000 votes (49.54%) to 290,719 (47.38%) for his Congress opponent, Vyricherla Kishore Chandra Suryanarayana Deo, and 18,952 for two minor opponents. He was appointed to the Lok Sabha Standing Committee on Labour and Welfare, and served until the 2004 election, when he sought unsuccessfully re-election.

Personal life 
He is married to Swarnalata. He enjoys reading and writing poetry; a collection of his poetry in Telugu, Assa Geevulu, has been published.

References 

India MPs 1999–2004
1968 births
Members of the Andhra Pradesh Legislative Assembly
Lok Sabha members from Andhra Pradesh
Indian anesthesiologists
Living people
Telugu Desam Party politicians
Telugu poets
People from Vizianagaram district
Telugu politicians
20th-century Indian medical doctors
Adivasi politicians
Medical doctors from Andhra Pradesh